Killian Heffernan (born 10 July 2002 in Dublin) is an Irish professional darts player who currently plays in the Professional Darts Corporation (PDC) events. He reached the final of the 2018 BDO World Youth Darts Championship.

Career
In 2018 he reached the final BDO World Youth Darts Championship which took place at the Lakeside Country Club in Frimley Green. In September 2017, the Youth tournament was played down to the final two. The final took place on 11 January 2018, he faced Justin van Tergouw in the final, losing 3–1.

In 2019 he won the WDF Europe Cup Youth for Ireland, alongside Keane Barry, Damien Moore and Dylan Slevin. They beat the Netherlands in the final.

Heffernan quit the BDO in 2020 and played PDC Q-School in 2021 but failed to progress to the main round for a chance to earn a tour card.

World Championship results

BDO
 2018: Final (lost to Justin van Tergouw 1–3) (Youth) (sets)

JDC

 2019: Semi-Finals (lost to Lennon Cradock 3–4) (legs)

External links
 WDF Boys Rankings

References

Living people
Irish darts players
British Darts Organisation players
Professional Darts Corporation associate players
2002 births
Sportspeople from Dublin (city)